The Gyeongbu Line (Gyeongbuseon) is a railway line in South Korea and is considered to be the most important and one of the oldest ones in the country. It was constructed in 1905, connecting Seoul with Busan via Suwon, Daejeon, and Daegu. It is by far the most heavily travelled rail line in South Korea.

All types of high-speed, express, local, and freight trains provide frequent service along its entire length.

History

In 1894–1895, the Empire of Japan and Qing China fought the First Sino-Japanese War for influence over Korea. Following the war, Japan competed with the Russian Empire's railway expansion in Northeast Asia, which led it to seek the right from the Korean Empire to build a railway from Busan to Keijō. This railway line was intended by Japan to solidify its strategic positions against Russia, which it would later go to war. Surveying began in 1896, and in spite of local protests, the Korean Empire gave Japan the right to build the line in 1898. Construction of the railway started on August 20, 1901, with a ceremony at Eitōho-ku, Keijō. Construction was supervised by Japanese, with local Koreans commandeered into forced labor and paid with coupons.

Japan also sought to gain control of the Keigi Railway project that was to continue tracks further north, recognizing the trunk route as a means to keep Korea under its influence. After the outbreak of the Russo-Japanese War, Japan ignored Korea's declaration of neutrality and transported troops to Incheon. Japan also forced the Korean government to sign an agreement that ceded its control of the railway. Japanese military bases were established in connection with the railway, the biggest of them next to Ryūzan Station in Keijō.

The first trains travelled the line in 17 hours 4 minutes. The line developed into the backbone of transport in Korea under Japanese rule. Following the Japanese invasion of Manchuria, from April 1, 1933, the line was traversed by direct trains from Busan to Andong (today Dandong) across the border.

Travel times increased greatly while the line was used for transport in World War II. Following World War II, the Seoul–Busan express train re-established on May 20, 1946, was named Chosun Liberator. During the Korean War, the line transported troops and refugees. The line remained the backbone of transport in South Korea after the war, when diesel locomotives and the cross-country Mugunghwa-ho train class was introduced. Following the 1961 coup, the Supreme Council for National Reconstruction started South Korea's first five-year plan, which included a construction program to complete the railway network, to foster economic growth. On the Gyeongbu Line, the effort was advertised with a new class of express trains named Jaegeon-ho, (Reconstruction train) introduced on May 15, 1962.

From the 1960s, road construction began to make road transport more attractive and faster.

Upgrade

The Gyeongbu Line was extensively upgraded in parallel with the development of the Seoul Metropolitan Subway urban rapid transit system and the Korea Train Express (KTX) high-speed rail system from the 1970s.

The Gyeongbu Line is six-tracked from Seoul to Guro, four-tracked from Guro to Cheonan, and double-tracked from Cheonan all the way to Busan. The entire line is electrified.

Relationship with the KTX project

The Seoul-Busan axis is Korea's main traffic corridor. In 1995, it housed 73.3% of Korea's population, and conducted 70% of the freight traffic and 66% of the passenger traffic. With both the Gyeongbu Expressway and Korail's Gyeongbu Line congested, the government saw the need to develop railways. The first proposals for a second Seoul-Busan railway line originated from a study prepared between 1972 and 1974 by experts of France's SNCF and Japan Railway Technical Service (JARTS) on a request from the IBRD. A more detailed 1978-1981 study by KAIST, focusing on the needs of freight transport, also came to the conclusion that the necessary capacity for freight transport on the existing Gyeongbu Line could best be released by separating off long-distance passenger traffic on a parallel high speed passenger railway, which was then taken up in Korea's next Five Year Plan.

Following the 1997 Asian Financial Crisis, the government decided to finish the Gyeongbu High Speed Railway (Gyeongbu HSR) in two phases, and upgrade and electrify the conventional Gyeongbu Line for KTX services on the sections paralleling the parts of the high-speed line not completed in the first phase.

Plans foresaw the development of the Gyeongbu Line into a high-capacity freight corridor after the completion of the second phase of the Gyeongbu HSR. At the time of the opening of the Daegu–Busan section of the high-speed line on November 1, 2010, capacity available for freight trains on the conventional line was expected to increase by a factor of 7.7, while the capacity for passenger transport in the entire corridor increased by a factor of 3.4.

Electrification

The line was electrified in stages from 1974 to 2006:

For KTX trains and new electric locomotives, top speed was also raised to up to 150 km/h.

Services

The Gyeongbu Line is the major route out of Seoul and Yongsan stations and, in addition to regular departures for Busan, trains travel along the Gyeongbu Line en route to Janghang, Gwangju, Mokpo, Suncheon, Yeosu, Pohang, Ulsan, Haeundae, Masan, and Jinju. Trains for Jecheon, Andong, and Yeongju also operate along sections of the Gyeongbu Line.

On the section between Seoul Station, Guro (where roughly half of the trains leave the Gyeongbu Line to head out to Incheon via the Gyeongin Line), Suwon, and Byeongjeom, Seoul Subway Line 1 provides frequent commuter services.

The Gyeongbu Line is served along its entire length by frequent intercity Saemaul-ho and cross-country Mugunghwa-ho trains. Some trains run along the entire length of the line, others only on some sections, including trains diverging to the connected lines. As of October 2010, direct Saemaul day trains connect Seoul to Busan in a minimum 4 hours 50 minutes, and Mughungwa trains in a minimum 5 hours 28 minutes.

KTX

Korail launched KTX high-speed services with the opening of the first phase of the Gyeongbu HSR on April 1, 2004. The Seoul–Busan travel distance was shortened to 408.5 km, the shortest travel time was 2 hours 40 minutes.

All KTX services use the conventional Gyeongbu Line between Seoul and the start of the Siheung Interconnection at a junction after Geumcheon-gu Office station, until the Siheung Interconnection diverges in a tunnel towards the present start of the Gyeongbu HSR. The terminal for most Gyeongbu KTX services is Seoul Station, for most Honam KTX services, Yongsan station. In addition, some trains continue beyond Seoul Station for 14.9 km along the Gyeongui Line to terminate at Haengsin station, next to which KTX trains have a depot. An additional stop at Yeongdeungpo station was proposed in 2004, however, the plans were dropped in face of opposition from locals living around Gwangmyeong station along the Gyeongbu HSR, who feared that Yeongdeungpo would draw away passengers from the new station and force its closing. However, the November 1, 2010, timetable change made Yeongdeungpo a KTX stop, for newly introduced trains that also use the Gyeongbu Line on the entire Seoul–Daejeon section, to serve Suwon.

From its opening, the Gyeongbu KTX service also returned to the Gyeongbu Line for two short sections crossing Daejeon and Daegu, where local disputes about the high-speed line alignment across urban areas held up construction; and all the way from Daegu to Busan. Consequently, all but two of the stations of the Gyeongbu KTX service were on the conventional Gyeongbu Line: after the two stations on the high-speed line, Gwangmyeong and Cheonan-Asan, stops were at Daejeon, Dongdaegu (East Daegu), Miryang, Gupo and Busan. Some Gyeongbu KTX services maintained service on this relation after the November 1, 2010, opening of the second phase of the Gyeongbu HSR, with the daily number of halts in Miryang and Gupo increased. Korail met local demands by introducing additional KTX services between Seoul and Dongdaegu in June 2007, which used the conventional Gyeongbu Line between Daejeon and Dongdaegu to serve Gimcheon and Gumi. However, these services were discontinued with the opening of the Gimcheon–Gumi station on the high-speed line.

The section between Daegu and Samnangjin, the junction with the Gyeongjeon Line, is also used by the Gyeongjeon KTX services, which connect Seoul to Masan on the Gyeongjeon Line since December 15, 2010, and will be extended to Jinju by 2012. Stops along the Gyeongbu Line will be at Dongdaegu and Miryang.

Evolution of long-distance passenger traffic

Between Seoul and Cheonan, the Mugunghwa and Saemaul express trains on the Gyeongbu Line gave rail around a fifth of the modal share before the launch of KTX services. Due to the short distance and the location of the KTX station outside the city, the conventional line could retain most of its passengers, and the increase in the total modal share of rail was modest. On the medium-distance relation from Seoul to Daejeon, KTX gained market share mostly at the expense of normal express services on the Gyeongbu Line, which decreased by half in the first year, while the total share of rail increased to a third. On the long-distance relations from Seoul to Daegu and Busan, the total share of rail increased from around two-fifths to a market dominating three-fifths, with the bulk of that traffic taken by the KTX. For intercity passenger traffic on the conventional Gyeongbu Line, that translates to a sharp drop on the Daejeon-Daegu section (bypassed by KTX trains) and a sharp increase on the Daegu-Busan section.

Station list

See also
 Korail

References

 
Railway lines in South Korea
Railway lines opened in 1905
Korail lines
1905 establishments in Korea